Red Marauder (4 March 1990 – 22 November 2016) was a race horse that won the 2001 Grand National at 33/1. Only four horses completed the race successfully - two of those having been remounted - due partly to the desperate conditions at Aintree and mainly thanks to the loose horse Paddy's Return causing mayhem at the Canal Turn.

Red Marauder and Smarty had the race to themselves for much of the second circuit before the former surged clear of his tired rival from two out to record a distance victory. It was the slowest time recorded for a Grand National for one hundred and eighteen years.

The Grand National win was a first for Sunderland-based horse owner Norman Mason who had entered Red Marauder in the previous year's race where he fell.

Trainer Richard Guest was also the jockey that day and was in possession of the retired horse until the latter's death at the age of 26 on 22 November 2016.

Pedigree

References

External links
 Career 1-2-3 Colour Chart – Red Marauder

1990 racehorse births
2016 racehorse deaths
National Hunt racehorses
Non-Thoroughbred racehorses
Racehorses trained in the United Kingdom
Racehorses bred in the United Kingdom
Grand National winners